Meadows School may refer to:

The Meadows School, Las Vegas
The Meadows Elementary School (DeSoto, Texas)
The Meadows School of the Arts at Southern Methodist University, Texas
The Meadows Community School, former name of Whittington Green School in Old Whittington, Derbyshire, England